UFC 188: Velasquez vs. Werdum was a mixed martial arts event held on June 13, 2015, at Arena Ciudad de México in Mexico City, Mexico.

Background
The event was headlined by a UFC Heavyweight Championship unification bout between then champion Cain Velasquez and then interim champion Fabrício Werdum. The bout was originally expected to take place at UFC 180. However, Velasquez pulled out of the bout due to a knee injury and the event was instead headlined by an interim title bout between Werdum and Mark Hunt.

A lightweight bout between Francisco Treviño and Johnny Case was originally expected to take place at UFC Fight Night: McGregor vs. Siver. However, on December 23, it was announced that Trevino had to pull out of the bout due to an injury. The fight was later rescheduled for this event.

Héctor Urbina was expected to face Albert Tumenov at the event. However, Urbina was forced to pull out of the fight due to an arm injury and was replaced by promotional newcomer Andrew Todhunter. The bout was then cancelled altogether on June 11 after Todhunter was medically disqualified from the card (and subsequently released from the promotion) after dealing with issues while cutting weight. Tumenov will receive his contracted show money.

On July 6, it was announced that Gilbert Melendez tested positive for testosterone metabolites of an exogenous origin. He denied using anything, but stated that he is "responsible for the products he uses and their implications". Melendez was suspended one year, effective from the date of his bout against Eddie Alvarez. As a result of the suspension, he was pulled from his fight against Al Iaquinta at UFC Fight Night: Mir vs. Duffee on July 15. On July 17, Augusto Montaño was announced as another fighter who tested positive for the same metabolites as Melendez. He was also suspended for a year.

Results

Bonus awards
The following fighters were awarded $50,000 bonuses:
Fight of the Night: Yair Rodríguez vs. Charles Rosa
Performances of the Night: Patrick Williams and Fabrício Werdum

See also
List of UFC events
2015 in UFC

References

Ultimate Fighting Championship events
Events in Mexico City
Sports competitions in Mexico City
Mixed martial arts in Mexico
2015 in mixed martial arts
June 2015 sports events in Mexico